The 2016–17 CWHL season was the tenth in the history of the Canadian Women's Hockey League (CWHL). Opening weekend took place on Saturday, October 15 and Sunday, October 16, with a pair of series taking place in the Greater Toronto Area. The Toronto Furies hosted the Boston Blades in the first Heritage Game of the season. The 2016 Commissioners Trophy winning Canadiennes de Montreal took on the Brampton Thunder during opening weekend. The defending Clarkson Cup champion Calgary Inferno played their first game of the season on October 22, as they hosted the Brampton Thunder. Ottawa's Canadian Tire Centre was the host venue for the Clarkson Cup finals for the second consecutive year.

Offseason
August 27: The Calgary Inferno acquired Genevieve Lacasse from the Boston Blades, completing the trade that sent Tara Watchorn to the Blades in the summer of 2014.

CWHL Draft

The 2016 draft for the Canadian Women's Hockey League took place in Toronto on August 21, 2016. Kayla Tutino of the Boston University Terriers women's ice hockey program was selected first overall by the Boston Blades.

Regular season
On December 11, 2016, Caroline Ouellette logged a pair of assists, eclipsing the 300-point mark. Of note, Ouellette became the first player in the history of the CWHL to reach this plateau. 
On December 11, 2016, goaltender Lauren Dahm gained the first win of her CWHL career, as the Boston Blades defeated the Toronto Furies in a shoot-out.

Heritage Games
In honor of the CWHL's tenth anniversary season, all teams participated in Heritage Games, honoring team alumnae. 
 
October 15, 2016 - Boston Blades @ Toronto Furies
November 19, 2016 - Calgary Inferno @ Brampton Thunder
December 10, 2016 - Calgary Inferno @ Les Canadiennes de Montreal - Played at Montreal's Bell Centre
January 7, 2016 - Les Canadiennes de Montreal @ Boston Blades
February 4, 2016 - Boston Blades @ Calgary Inferno

All-Star Game

The CWHL All-Star Game was held at Toronto's Air Canada Centre on February 11, 2017. This marks the third time that the ACC has served as host venue for the event. Jess Jones of the Brampton Thunder and Jillian Saulnier of the Calgary Inferno both scored a hat trick as members of Team White, becoming the first competitors in CWHL All-Star Game history to achieve the feat.

Standings

Statistical leaders

Clarkson Cup playoffs

Awards and honors

Regular season
Chairman's Trophy: Calgary Inferno

Postseason awards
2017 Clarkson Cup Playoff MVP: Charline Labonte
First Star of the Game 2017 Clarkson Cup: Charline Labonte
Second Star of the Game 2017 Clarkson Cup: Marie-Philip Poulin
Third Star of the Game 2017 Clarkson Cup: Jillian Saulnier

CWHL Awards

CWHL All-Rookie Team
 Goaltender: Emerance Maschmeyer, Calgary
 Defender: Renata Fast, Toronto
 Defender: Katelyn Gosling, Calgary
 Forward: Laura Stacey, Brampton
 Forward: Kate Leary, Boston
 Forward: Michela Cava, Toronto

References

 
Canadian Women's Hockey League seasons
1